Delavan Township may refer to the following townships in the United States:

 Delavan Township, Tazewell County, Illinois
 Delavan Township, Faribault County, Minnesota